Bras d'Or Lake Biosphere Reserve (established 2011) is a UNESCO Biosphere Reserve located at Bras d'Or Lake, Cape Breton Island, Nova Scotia, Canada. It consists of a salt-water estuary watershed inland sea with three passages to the Atlantic Ocean. The Holocene transgression flooded a complex river-lake system of diverse geology, creating the small, deep inland sea with 12 significant watersheds draining both highlands and lowlands.

The terrestrial, marine and coastal habitats provide a home for human populations, as well as other organisms. The original settlers colonized the region following the retreat of glaciers, and today their descendants make up the five Mi'kmaq populations that account for a significant proportion of the population occupying large areas of the watershed.

Area 

Ecological characteristics 

The Bras d'Or Lake is an estuarine system located in the middle of Cape Breton Island. It lies northeast of mainland Nova Scotia, and is joined to the mainland by a  causeway constructed in 1955. Differential erosion has resulted in steep hills around the lake and peninsulas within it, which divide the estuarine ecosystem into five long, deep channels in the north half of the lake and a number of bays in the south.

Extensive wetland and bog deposits occur in the upper reaches of the watershed, specifically in the Cape Breton Highlands, the Boisdale Hills and the East Bay Hills. Large wetlands in the highland portions of the Middle River and Baddeck River serve to store and release water slowly to these major sub-watersheds within the Bras d'Or Lake.

The most common fish of the boreal group found in the area are cod (Gadus morhua), white hake (Urophycis tenuis) and winter skate (Raja ocellatus). Representatives of the Arctic-boreal group include alligatorfish (Aspidophoroides monopterygius) and daubed shanny (Lumpenus maculatus).

Socio-economic characteristics 

Indigenous First Nations populations living within the biosphere reserve form part of Mi'kmaq communities, with the majority living in four (of the six) official reserves: We'koqmaq (Whycocomagh), Wagmatcook, Eskasoni and Potlotek. The fifth reserve, Malagawatch (occupied seasonally), is also situated within the biosphere reserve area. A sixth reserve, Membertou, is located near Sydney, just outside the biosphere reserve area, but is closely associated with indigenous communities within the biosphere reserve.

The majority of employment in the reserve is linked to the tertiary service industry, although fishing, resource extraction, trading and research related to natural resources also take place.

See also 
 Biosphere Reserves of Canada

Sources

References 

Biosphere reserves of Canada
Protected areas of Nova Scotia